Salman Saeed Al-Hariri (born July 12, 1988) is a Saudi footballer who plays for Al-Noor as a winger.

References

External links 
 

1988 births
Living people
Saudi Arabian footballers
Al-Noor FC players
Ettifaq FC players
Khaleej FC players
Al-Faisaly FC players
Ittihad FC players
Najran SC players
Hajer FC players
Al Safa FC players
Al-Taraji Club players
Association football wingers
People from Qatif
Saudi First Division League players
Saudi Fourth Division players
Saudi Second Division players
Saudi Third Division players
Saudi Professional League players